Reserve Naturel de Sel Iode is a small reserve in Nouakchott, Mauritania. It is located on the Avenue Gamal Abdel Nasser, near the Ministry of Energy headquarters and opposite the Centro Neuro Psychiatrique de Nouakchott.

References

Protected areas of Mauritania
Nouakchott